Qermez Dere is an early Neolithic settlement in the northwestern edges of Tal Afar in Nineveh Governorate, Iraq. This archaeological site was discovered in the 1980s during a rescue operation. The buildings were made of primitive Mudbricks, which is not a perennial material, and are mostly destroyed, however archaeologists have excavated a one-room structure in good shape. The room's corners are rounded, showing the care that went into its construction. Also vestiges of non-structural clay columns have been found, suggesting primitive instances of furniture.

See also 

 Ginnig

References

Populated places established in the 9th millennium BC
1980s archaeological discoveries
Neolithic settlements
Archaeological sites in Iraq